The 1981 Baltimore Orioles season was the franchise's 28th season based in Baltimore and 81st overall season as a member of the American League. Games were suspended for 50 days due to the 1981 Major League Baseball strike, causing a split season. The Orioles competed as members of the American League East, finishing second in the first half of the season and fourth in the second half of the season; their overall record was 59 wins and 46 losses. The Orioles hit five grand slams, the most in MLB in 1981.

Offseason 
 December 15, 1980: Paul Hartzell was released by the Orioles.
 January 22, 1981: Joe Kerrigan and John Buffamoyer (minors) were traded by the Orioles to the Cincinnati Reds for Mike Grace and John Hale.

Regular season 
 August 10, 1981: Cal Ripken Jr. made his major league debut in a game against the Kansas City Royals.

Notable transactions 
 April 1, 1981: Kiko Garcia was traded by the Orioles to the Houston Astros for Chris Bourjos and cash.
 June 8, 1981: 1981 Major League Baseball Draft
Jeff Schaefer was drafted by the Orioles in the 12th round.
Cecil Fielder was drafted by the Orioles in the 31st round, but did not sign.

Season standings

Record vs. opponents

Roster

Player stats

Batting

Starters by position 
Note: Pos = Position; G = Games played; AB = At bats; H = Hits; Avg. = Batting average; HR = Home runs; RBI = Runs batted in

Other batters 
Note: G = Games played; AB = At bats; H = Hits; Avg. = Batting average; HR = Home runs; RBI = Runs batted in

Pitching

Starting pitchers 
Note: G = Games pitched; IP = Innings pitched; W = Wins; L = Losses; ERA = Earned run average; SO = Strikeouts

Other pitchers 
Note: G = Games pitched; IP = Innings pitched; W = Wins; L = Losses; ERA = Earned run average; SO = Strikeouts

Relief pitchers 
Note: G = Games pitched; W = Wins; L = Losses; SV = Saves; ERA = Earned run average; SO = Strikeouts

Awards and honors 
 Dennis Martínez, American League Leader Victories (14)
All-Star Game

Farm system 

LEAGUE CHAMPIONS: Hagerstown

Notes

References 

1981 Baltimore Orioles team page at Baseball Reference
1981 Baltimore Orioles season at baseball-almanac.com

Baltimore Orioles seasons
Baltimore Orioles
Baltimore Orioles